The 2017–18 Basketball League of Serbia is the 12th season of the Basketball League of Serbia, the highest professional basketball league in Serbia. It is also 74th national championship played by Serbian clubs inclusive of nation's previous incarnations as Yugoslavia and Serbia & Montenegro.

Teams

Promotion and relegation 
Napredak Rubin who competed in the BLS during the last season changed the tier with KKK Radnički. By approval from Basketball Federation of Serbia, Napredak moved to the 3rd-tier First Regional League (West).
Teams promoted from the Second League
Zlatibor
Vojvodina
Teams relegated to the Second League
Smederevo 1953
Konstantin

Venues and locations

Personnel and sponsorship

Coaching changes

First League

League table

Super League

Qualified teams

Group A

Group B

Playoffs

Bracket

Quarterfinals

5th–8th place semifinals

|}

Semifinals

Seventh place games  

|}

Finals

Super League final standings

See also
2017–18 Basketball League of Serbia B
2017–18 Radivoj Korać Cup
2017–18 ABA League
2017–18 First Women's Basketball League of Serbia
Teams 
 2017–18 KK Crvena zvezda season
 2017–18 KK Partizan season

References

External links
 Official website of Serbian Basketball League

Basketball League of Serbia seasons
Serbia
Basketball